The 1935 DePaul Blue Demons football team was an American football team that represented DePaul University as an independent during the 1935 college football season. The team compiled a 5–2–1 record and outscored all opponents by a total of 123 to 36. The team played its home games at Wrigley Field in Chicago. Jim Kelly was the head coach.

Schedule

References

DePaul
DePaul Blue Demons football seasons
DePaul Blue Demons football